Montell Samuel Daley (born 31 August 1994), known professionally as MoStack, is a British rapper and singer from Hornsey in North London. After releasing a string of online songs and non-album singles between 2014 and 2016, he released his debut mixtape, High Street Kid on 2 June 2017; which debuted at number 16 on the UK Albums Chart. His debut studio album, Stacko, was released on 7 June 2019; and debuted at number 3 on the UK Albums Chart. In addition to his own material, MoStack is also known for featuring on the hit singles "No Words" (by Dave) and "Fashion Week" (by Steel Banglez); which peaked at number 17 and number 7 in the UK respectively.

Personal life 
MoStack is autistic. He is a supporter of the football club Arsenal F.C.

Discography

Studio albums

Mixtapes

Singles

As lead artist

As featured artist

Other charted songs

Guest appearances

Awards and nominations

References

External links 
 

Living people
1994 births
Black British male rappers
21st-century Black British male singers
Rappers from London
People from Hornsey
People on the autism spectrum